Jebel Ali Village (JAV) is a neighbourhood in Jebel Ali, southern Dubai, United Arab Emirates. Now it is a redevelopment by Nakheel Properties of the existing Jebel Ali Village. Churches Complex of Jebel Ali is located here.

History
The original Jebel Ali Village was constructed in 1977 to provide accommodation to construction contractors' staff. At this time, Sheikh Rashid bin Saeed Al Maktoum planned to develop Jebel Ali into an industrial area with its own airport, port, and township. The remoteness from central Dubai meant that Jebel Ali Village had to be self-sufficient, making residents develop a strong attachment to the area, even after they had left. Jebel Ali Village was effectively a small British-style garden city. It was a project of Sir William Halcrow and Partners and acted as a prototype for further semi-autonomous residential areas in Dubai such as Emirates Hills and The Gardens.

Construction for the redevelopment of Jebel Ali village had begun by 2008 and was originally expected to be completed by 2013. The existing villas were to be demolished to give space for new ones. Jebel Ali Village upon completion was planned to include commercial, community, and retail facilities, and the expansion of the existing central park to 12 hectares. However the project was put on hold, because of the global financial crisis of 2008–2009, which affected Dubai severely. Instead, Nakheel announced in 2013 that the company intended to renovate the existing villas.

In 2021, it was announced that the previously isolated Jebel Ali Village was to be transformed to make way for luxury villas. The existing tenants were given a year to move, with eviction notices served on them. There are plans for redevelopment with large villas.

Location
To the north are The Gardens and Discovery Gardens. To the east is Al Furjan. To the south is the Jebel Ali Industrial area. The Ibn Battuta Mall and the Ibn Battuta metro station on the Red Line of the Dubai Metro are close by, to the northwest.

Churches Complex is located here, immediately south of the Al Muntazah residential complex.

Churches Complex 
The Churches Complex in Jebel Ali Village , is an area for a number of churches and temples of different religious denominations, especially Christian denominations.

Churches and temples in the complex include:

 St Francis of Assisi Catholic Church
 Christ Church Jebel Ali Anglican Church
 Dubai Evangelical Church Centre (DECC)
 St Mina Copts Orthodox Church
 The Mar Thoma Parish Church
 Mor Ignatius Jacobite Syrian Orthodox Cathedral
 Archdiocese Of Roum Orthodox Church
 Gurunanak Darbar Dubai Sikh Temple
Hindu Temple, Jebel Ali

See also
 Churches Complex
 Developments in Dubai

References

1977 establishments in the United Arab Emirates
Communities in Dubai
Mixed-use developments in the United Arab Emirates
Nakheel Properties